Dalila Jakupović and Irina Khromacheva are the defending champions, however Jakupović chose not to participate. Khromacheva was scheduled to partner countrywoman Olga Doroshina, but the pair withdrew after Khromacheva sustained a viral illness.

Peng Shuai and Yang Zhaoxuan won the title, defeating Duan Yingying and Han Xinyun 7–5, 6–2 in the final.

Seeds

Draw

Draw

References

External Links
Main Draw

Kunming Open - Doubles